Jean Bothorel (12 May 1940) is a French journalist and the author of many books. He is a former editor at Le Figaro. He was the 1993 winner of the Prix Goncourt de la Biographie.

Career
Bothorel is a journalist. He first worked for L'Expansion, followed by La Vie and Le Matin de Paris. In 1986, he joined Le Figaro as an editor. He was fired a decade later because of the publication of Le Bal des vautours, in which he criticized senior editors Franz-Olivier Giesbert and Alain Peyrefitte.

Bothorel is the author of many books. He co-authored a book with President Pierre Mendès-France and authored three biographies of President Valéry Giscard d'Estaing. He also co-authored a book with French politician Raymond Barre and another one with Guinean President Alpha Condé. He authored biographies of French businessmen François Pinault and Vincent Bolloré. Additionally, he authored a novel, Le désir et la mort. He received the Prix Goncourt de la Biographie for his biography work Louise de Vilmorin in 1993.

Jean Bothorel has also been widely criticized in the media for a number of articles published in the Figaro which accused some political parties or personalities based on lies and total absence of facts. In a recent publications, the author praise the Bolloré family (a French billionaire) with the publication of "Vincent Bolloré, une histoire de famille", raising suspicion on his supporters'motives.

Works

References

External links 
 Jean Bothorel on data.bnf.fr

People from Finistère
Living people
1940 births
Breton nationalists
French biographers
French male novelists
20th-century French novelists
20th-century French male writers
21st-century French novelists
20th-century French journalists
21st-century French journalists
Prix Goncourt de la Biographie winners
21st-century French male writers
French male non-fiction writers
Male biographers
Le Figaro people